The Carei (also: Caréi or Careï) is a river that flows through the Alpes-Maritimes department of southeastern France. Its source is near Castillon, and it flows into the Mediterranean Sea in Menton.

References

Rivers of France
Rivers of Alpes-Maritimes
Rivers of Provence-Alpes-Côte d'Azur
0Carei